Dmitri Margaryan (born January 14, 1978, in Yerevan, Armenian SSR) is an Armenian retired swimmer. He competed at the 2000 Summer Olympics in the men's 50 metre freestyle.

References

External links
 Sports-Reference.com

1978 births
Living people
Sportspeople from Yerevan
Armenian male freestyle swimmers
Olympic swimmers of Armenia
Swimmers at the 2000 Summer Olympics